Juliet Lyon CBE is the director of the Prison Reform Trust.

She won the Perrie Award in 2014.

References

External links
Prison Reform Trust

British charity and campaign group workers
Commanders of the Order of the British Empire
Year of birth missing (living people)
Living people
Prison reformers